Gilcrux is a civil parish in the Borough of Allerdale in Cumbria, England.  It contains two listed buildings that are recorded in the National Heritage List for England.  Of these, one is  listed at Grade II*, the middle grade, and the other is at Grade II, the lowest grade.  The parch contains the village of Gilcrux and the surrounding countryside.  The listed buildings consist of a church, and a farm and farm building.


Key

Buildings

References

Citations

Sources

Lists of listed buildings in Cumbria